Altair was the name of at least two ships of the Italian Navy and may refer to:

 , a  launched in 1936 and sunk in 1941.
 , a  launched in 1943 as USS Gandy. Transferred to Italy and renamed in 1951. Re-rated as a frigate in 1957 and sunk as a target in 1971.

Italian Navy ship names